Endocoelus orbicularis, is a species of handsome fungus beetle found in Sri Lanka.

Description
Typical length of male is about 10 mm. Body orbicular. Head exerted, with small prominent coarsely granulated eyes. Elytra sub-globularly convex. Elytral disk is evenly and strongly punctured. Antennae with 10 segments where the two basal joints are stout. The third to the seventh segments are very short. The three last segments collectively form the elongate lax club. Thorax short, narrowed in front, with a raised thickened and flattened margin. Base is narrower than the elytra at their base. Tarsi are four-jointed, and are almost linear.

References 

Endomychidae
Insects of Sri Lanka
Insects described in 1886